QGA can refer to:

 Quinn Gillespie & Associates
 Queen's Gambit Accepted, chess opening